"Second Hand Rose" is a 1921 popular song written by Grant Clarke and James F. Hanley for Fanny Brice.

Fanny Brice version
Fanny Brice introduced the song in the revue Ziegfeld Follies of 1921 which opened at the Globe Theater (now known as the Lunt-Fontanne Theatre) on Broadway on June 21, 1921. Although one critic found this production of the revue not as good as previous versions, an exception was Brice:  "This inimitable artist chalked up one of the few high marks of the evening with this song. For clarity of utterance, economy of means and a highly developed comic sense, Miss Brice has no peer on our stage. She got a genuine reception on her entrance and clamorous applause for her exit. And earned every bit of it legitimately."

Brice's 1922 recording of the song became a hit record, reaching #6 (US). The song was also sung by Brice in the 1928 film My Man.

The song's popularity inspired a 1922 screen dramatization starring Gladys Walton.

Chart performance

Barbra Streisand version

Barbra Streisand, who had starred in Funny Girl, the 1964 Broadway musical based on Brice's life, recorded "Second Hand Rose" as part of her 1965 television special My Name Is Barbra, releasing it as a single for the tie-in studio album My Name Is Barbra, Two....

Streisand remembers in Just For The Record: "'Second Hand Rose' became part of a tongue-in-cheek fantasy sequence which was shot at Bergdorf Goodman's... And thanks to people I loved and loved working with—Joe Layton, Dwight Hemion, Peter Matz, Robert Emmett, Tom John, and, of course, Marty — I was able to realize my dream."

Her rendition became an international hit, reaching #14 in the UK, #6 in Australia, #32 on the U.S. Billboard Hot 100, and number one on the Canadian Adult Contemporary chart. (The record was subsequently included in Streisand's 1970 greatest hits compilation.)

Streisand had received similar acclaim for her cover of the Brice hit "My Man". The success of these recordings prompted both "Second Hand Rose" and "My Man" to be included in the 1968 film adaptation of Funny Girl, despite neither song appearing in the original stage musical.

Chart performance

References

External links
Second Hand Rose (digitized version of the sheet music) on Digital Collections, New York Public Library.
 
 

1921 songs
1922 singles
1965 singles
Fanny Brice songs
Barbra Streisand songs
Columbia Records singles
Songs from musicals
Pop standards
Songs from Funny Girl (film)
United States National Recording Registry recordings
Songs written by James F. Hanley
Songs written by Grant Clarke